Charge-transfer insulators are a class of materials predicted to be conductors following conventional band theory, but which are in fact insulators due to a charge-transfer process. Unlike in Mott insulators, where the insulating properties arise from electrons hopping between unit cells, the electrons in charge-transfer insulators move between atoms within the unit cell.  In the Mott–Hubbard case, it's easier for electrons to transfer between two adjacent metal sites (on-site Coulomb interaction U); here we have an excitation corresponding to the Coulomb energy U with

.

In the charge-transfer case, the excitation happens from the anion (e.g., oxygen) p level to the metal d level with the charge-transfer energy Δ:

.

U is determined by repulsive/exchange effects between the cation valence electrons. Δ is tuned by the chemistry between the cation and anion. One important difference is the creation of an oxygen p hole, corresponding to the change from a 'normal' O^2- to the ionic O- state.

Distinguishing between Mott-Hubbard and charge-transfer insulators can be done using the Zaanen-Sawatzky-Allen (ZSA) scheme.

Exchange Interaction 
Analogous to Mott insulators we also have to consider superexchange in charge-transfer insulators. One contribution is similar to the Mott case: the hopping of a d electron from one transition metal site to another and then back the same way. This process can be written as

.

This will result in an antiferromagnetic exchange (for nondegenerate d levels) with an exchange constant .

In the charge-transfer insulator case

.

This process also yields an antiferromagnetic exchange :

The difference between these two possibilities is the intermediate state, which has one ligand hole for the first exchange and two for the second.

The total exchange energy is the sum of both contributions:

.

References 

Quantum phases
Electronic band structures